Coomi Kapoor is currently the Contributing Editor of the Indian Express. Prior to working with the Express, Kapoor has worked in various publications including India Today, Sunday Mail, and Illustrated Weekly. Kapoor was with the Indian Express at the time Indira Gandhi had imposed emergency in India in 1975. Kapoor has written a new book on the Emergency called The Emergency: A Personal History. As of 2015, Coomi Kapoor is on the Executive Committee of the Editor's Guild of India.
Kapoor's brother-in-law is BJP leader Subramanian Swamy.

References

External links
Coomi Kapoor columns – The Indian Express

Year of birth missing (living people)
Living people
Indian editors
Place of birth missing (living people)